Paidia minoica is a moth of the family Erebidae. It was described by Josef J. de Freina in 2006. It is found on Crete. The habitat consists of forest fringes, wide forest clearings and fringes of shrubland on rocky soils at altitudes ranging from the lowlands to 1,400 meters above sea-level.

The wingspan is about 27 mm. Adults are on wing from May to June and again in October in the lowlands. At higher elevations, adults are on wing from late July to late September.

Etymology
The species is named from the mythological King Minos.

References

Nudariina
Moths described in 2006